Megacyllene powersi is a species of beetle in the family Cerambycidae occurring in the Dakotas. It was described by Linsley and Chemsak in 1963.

References

Megacyllene
Beetles described in 1963